The Sirius 26 is a Canadian sailboat that was designed by Jean Berret, modified by Vandestadt and McGruer and first built in 1987.

The Sirius 26 is a development of the Kelt 7.6, production of which ran from 1980 to 1984. The Sirius 26 primarily differs in having a reverse transom and a wing keel

Production
The design was built by Vandestadt and McGruer Limited in Canada, but only six examples of the type were produced before the company went out of business.

Design
The Sirius 26 is a recreational keelboat, built predominantly of fibreglass. It has a masthead sloop rig, a raked stem, a reverse transom, a transom-hung rudder controlled by a tiller and a fixed wing keel. It displaces  and carries  of lead ballast.

The design has sleeping accommodation for four people, with a double "V"-berth in the bow cabin and two straight settees in the main cabin. The galley is located on the port side just forward of the companionway ladder. The galley is equipped with a two-burner stove and a sink. A navigation station is opposite the galley, on the starboard side. The head is located opposite the galley on the starboard side.

See also
List of sailing boat types

Related development
Kelt 7.6

Similar sailboats
Beachcomber 25
Bayfield 25
Beneteau First 25.7
Bombardier 7.6
Cal 25
Cal 2-25
C&C 25
Capri 25
Catalina 25
Com-Pac 25
Dufour 1800
Freedom 25
Hunter 25.5
Kirby 25
MacGregor 25
Merit 25
Mirage 25
Northern 25
O'Day 25
Redline 25
Tanzer 25
Tanzer 7.5
US Yachts US 25
Watkins 25

References

Keelboats
1980s sailboat type designs
Sailing yachts
Sailboat type designs by Jean Berret
Sailboat types built by Vandestadt and McGruer Limited